Made an America is the debut EP by the American rapcore supergroup Fever 333. It was released on March 23, 2018, along with the announcement that the group signed to Roadrunner Records. The title track “Made an America” was nominated for Best Rock Performance at the 61st Annual Grammy Awards.

Track listing

References

2018 debut EPs
Fever 333 albums
Rapcore EPs